Polin may refer to:

People
 Polin Belisle (born 1966), marathon runner who represented Belize at the 1988 Summer Olympics
 Andrei Polin (born 1994), Russian footballer
 Captain Polin (1516–1578), French ambassador to the Ottoman Empire and General of the Galleys
 Claire Polin (1926–1995), American composer, musicologist and flutist
 Kate Polin (born 1967), French photographer
 Peter Polin (1832–1870), American merchant and politician
 Raymond Polin (1910–2001), French philosopher
 Soth Polin (born 1943), Cambodian writer
 Stephen Polin (born 1947), American artist
 Vicki Polin, founder of the Awareness Center

Other uses
 Polin, the Hebrew/Yiddish name of Poland
 POLIN Museum of the History of Polish Jews, a museum in Warsaw, Poland
 El Polin Spring, a natural spring in San Francisco, California
 Polin Waterparks, a Turkish manufacturer of water slides and water parks

See also
 McPolin Farmstead is a historic farm north of Park City, Utah, United States
 Ramot Polin, a neighbourhood in northwest East Jerusalem
 Parigné-le-Pôlin, a commune in the Sarthe department in the region of Pays-de-la-Loire in north-western France
 Yvré-le-Pôlin, a commune in the Sarthe department in the region of Pays-de-la-Loire in north-western France
 
 Paulin (disambiguation)
 Polen (disambiguation)
 Pollin